Riga FK (Rīgas futbola klubs, short – RFK) was a Latvian football club which was founded December 14, 1923. It was the strongest and most popular Latvian football club in 1920s and 1930s, it was also the base team for Latvia national football team in its early years. It was closed after World War II.

The idea for its creation came about in 1922 with the goal of uniting Latvian players on a team which could beat the mostly-German Ķeizarmežs. The founder and manager was Juris Rēdlihs, one of the most active football organizers in Latvia. In 1923, most of the best Latvian footballers from JKS moved to Riga FK. Those included Hermanis Saltups, Ašmanis, Eihmanis, Roga, Bone, Sokolovs, Zemīts and brothers Edvīns, Rūdolfs and Arvīds Bārda.

In its first season in the Riga championship Riga FK finished second – one point behind Ķeizarmežs. In 1924 Riga FK had a new manager who also managed the Latvia national football team – V.Malošek from Austria. Because it was prohibited to have foreign citizens playing in the Latvian league for that season, Ķeizarmežs didn't play in 1924.  Riga FC easily bet its closest rivals – ASK Riga in the Riga championship and beat the province champions from Cēsis 5–1, winning its first Latvian championship. In 1925 and 1926 Riga FK won its second and third titles.

In 1927, Olimpija Liepāja took gold, leaving RFC with second place. Several players (including Arvīds Jurgens, Voldemārs Plade, Česlavs Stančiks and Aleksandrs Ābrams) left Riga FK during this season in order to found a new team – Riga Vanderers. Olimpija also beat RFK in the battle for title in 1928 and 1929.

In the 1930s, the emergence of the best pre-war Latvian footballer, Ēriks Pētersons, once again brought good results for Riga FK – with titles in 1930 and 1931. In 1932, however, the team finished in its worst position so far – 3rd behind ASK and Riga Vanderers. The next titles for RK came in 1934 and 1935, when the team beat its competition by a large margin.

The last time that RFK won the Latvian title was in 1940, just months before Soviet occupation of Latvia. RFK was then disbanded with its best players joining FK Dinamo Rīga. In 1941, with the German occupation of Latvia, Riga FK and other Latvian football teams were restored and participated in the 1942–1944 championships. The fate of former RFK was different, with some continuing to play football in Soviet Latvia, others emigrating and some being killed in the war.

In 1992, the former FK Auda was renamed Riga FK but, after a couple of seasons without serious results, it was renamed Auda again.

In 2014 was found Riga Football Club.

Honours
Latvia top league:
Winners: 8 (1924–1926,1930–1931,1934–1935,1940)
Runners-up: 6 (1923,1927–1929,1933,1938)
Latvian Cup:
Winners: 2 (1937, 1939)

Association football clubs established in 1923
RFK
Association football clubs disestablished in 1944
1923 establishments in Latvia
1944 disestablishments in Latvia